Pseudomusonia fera is a species of praying mantis native to Costa Rica, Venezuela, and Panama.

See also
List of mantis genera and species

References

Mantidae
Mantodea of South America
Insects described in 1894